Frederick Russell Kappel (1902 – November 10, 1994) was an American businessman. He served as the 9th President of Western Electric from January 1954 until September 1956. He later served as chairman of AT&T from 1961 to 1972. He also served in the Johnson and Nixon administrations.

Early life 
Kappel grew up in Albert Lea, Minnesota. He graduated from the University of Minnesota.

Career 
He started his career at AT&T in 1924, working as a $25-a-week digger of telephone poles for one of its subsidiaries, the Northwestern Bell Telephone Company in Minnesota. In 1954, he became president of Western Electric, another subsidiary. In 1956, he was elected president of the American Telephone and Telegraph Company, later renamed AT&T. He also served as its chairman from 1961 to 1972. He served as chairman of the Business Council from 1963 to 1964.

President Lyndon B. Johnson appointed him as chairman of presidential commissions, including the Commission on Postal Organization and, in 1967, to a special mediation board in a railroad dispute. President Richard M. Nixon appointed him as a governor of the United States Postal Service and, from 1972 to 1974, as its chairman. He was on the cover of Time on May 29, 1964. He received the Presidential Medal of Freedom in 1964 and the John Fritz Medal in 1965.

He served on the boards of directors of Chase Manhattan Bank and General Foods. He also served as chairman of the board of International Paper from 1969 to 1971, and chairman of its executive committee from 1971 to 1972.

Personal life 
He had a first marriage in 1927 and a second marriage in 1978. He died of Alzheimer's disease in Sarasota, Florida, on November 10, 1994.

Bibliography
Business Purpose and Performance: Selections from Talks and Papers (1964)

References

External links 

 Frederick R. Kappel Oral History in the John F. Kennedy Presidential Library and Museum

1902 births
1994 deaths
People from Albert Lea, Minnesota
University of Minnesota alumni
AT&T people
United States Postal Service people
JPMorgan Chase people
Presidential Medal of Freedom recipients
Deaths from dementia in Florida
Deaths from Alzheimer's disease
20th-century American businesspeople
Henry Laurence Gantt Medal recipients
20th-century American engineers